Verene is a surname. Notable people with the surname include:

Chris Verene (born 1969), American photographer, performance artist, and musician
Donald Phillip Verene (born 1937), American philosopher and writer